Hardwick is a village in the civil parish of Hardwick-with-Yelford in West Oxfordshire. It lies on the river Windrush. Hardwick was historically a hamlet or chapelry in the ancient parish of Ducklington. It became a separate civil parish in 1866. In 1932 the parish was merged with the parish of Yelford and large parts of the parishes of Ducklington and Standlake to form the civil parish of Hardwick-with-Yelford.

References

Former civil parishes in Oxfordshire
Villages in Oxfordshire
West Oxfordshire District